Vladimir Semyonovich Smetanin (born 13 February 1937) is a retired Russian flyweight weightlifter who was active between 1961 and 1973. During this period he won five Soviet titles and three medals at world and European championships and set two ratified world records, both in the total (1970 and 1973).

Smetanin's father was executed during the Stalin's purges of 1937, and his family was moved from Moscow to the Urals, where he was raised by his mother.

References

1937 births
Living people
Soviet male weightlifters
European Weightlifting Championships medalists
World Weightlifting Championships medalists